Empire Dryden was a  cargo ship that was built in 1941 by William Doxford & Sons Ltd, Sunderland, Co Durham, United Kingdom for the Ministry of War Transport (MoWT).

Description
The ship was built in 1942 by William Doxford & Sons Ltd, Sunderland. She was yard number 682.

The engine was built by Fairfield & Co Ltd, Glasgow.

History
Empire Dryden was launched on 22 October 1941 and completed in February 1942. The United Kingdom Official Number 169010 and Code Letters BCTN were allocated. Her port of registry was Sunderland and she was placed under the management of Sir R Ropner & Co Ltd. She was armed with a four-inch gun, a 20 mm gun and four machine guns. Her crew totalled 51 officers and men, including six DEMS gunners.

Empire Dryden made her maiden voyage on 27 February 1942, departing from Sunderland to join Convoy FN 642, which had departed from Southend, Essex the previous day and arrived at Methil, Fife on 28 February. She then joined Convoy EN 53, which departed on 1 March and arrived at Oban, Argyllshire on 4 March. Empire Dryden was in ballast. She left the convoy at Loch Ewe on 3 March. She then joined Convoy ON 74, which departed from Liverpool, Lancashire on 9 March and arrived at Halifax, Nova Scotia, Canada on 25 March. She then joined Convoy XB 5, which departed on 27 March and arrived at Boston, Massachusetts, United States on 29 March. She left the convoy at the Cape Cod Canal that day and sailed to New York, arriving on 1 April.

She was bound for Alexandria, Egypt via Table Bay, South Africa. The torpedo hit the starboard side of the No. 2 hold, blowing off the bow and causing the ship to start sinking.

All on board took to the lifeboats, with some difficulty as the engine was still running. The next day, the smallest of the three lifeboats had to be abandoned as it was taking on water. The survivors in that lifeboat were divided between the other two lifeboats. One lifeboat with 25 of the crew and the three DEMS gunners on board was last seen on 22 April, and is presumed to have foundered in a gale sometime during the next two days. They were landed in Bermuda on 8 May. Those lost from Empire Dryden are commemorated on the Tower Hill Memorial, London.

References

External links
Survivors' account of the sinking and time on board the lifeboat

1941 ships
Ships built on the River Wear
Empire ships
Ministry of War Transport ships
Steamships of the United Kingdom
World War II shipwrecks in the Atlantic Ocean
Ships sunk by German submarines in World War II
Maritime incidents in April 1942